Waitt is a surname. Notable people with the surname include:

Charlie Waitt (1853–1912), baseball player
Chris Waitt (born 1974), filmmaker, musician and writer
Maude C. Waitt, member of the Ohio Senate
Mick Waitt, football coach who managed the New Zealand national team
Richard Waitt (died 1732), Scottish painter
Ted Waitt (born 1963), American billionaire, co-founder of Gateway, Inc

See also
Waitt Brick Block, historic block at 422-424 Main Street, Malden, Massachusetts
Waitt Peaks, cluster of pointed peaks, mostly snow-covered, northwest of Schirmacher Massif in the east part of Palmer Land
Waitt Radio Networks or Dial Global Local, national radio network based in Omaha, Nebraska
Dewait
The Wait (disambiguation)
Wait (disambiguation)